Jēkabpils district was an administrative division of Latvia, located in  Latgale region, in the country's east. It was organized into three cities and twenty one parishes, each with a local government authority. The main city in the district was Jēkabpils.

Jēkabpils lies on both banks of the Daugava River. In the south the district bordered Lithuania and the length of the border was 44 km. It bordered the former districts of Madona to the north, Aizkraukle to the west, Preiļi and Daugavpils to the east.

The total area of the district was 2,998 km², the population was 53,473, making it the fifth largest region in Latvia based on area and population.

On 4 January 2000, the unemployment rate was 10.6% of the economically active population according to the State Employment Board data.

Jēkabpils was the eighth largest city in Latvia. There were two towns in the region—Viesīte with 2,230 inhabitants and Aknīste with 1,350 inhabitants. Urban population was 32,800 people, rural 25,000 living in 20 parishes and 2 towns.

Districts were eliminated during the administrative-territorial reform in 2009.

Cities and parishes in Jēkabpils District

 Aknīste city
 Asare parish
 Atašiene parish
 Ābeļi parish
 Dignāja parish
 Dunava parish
 Elkšņi parish
 Gārsene parish
 Jēkabpils city
 Jēkabpils parish
 Kalna parish
 Krustpils parish
 Kūku parish
 Leimaņi parish
 Mežāre parish
 Rite parish
 Rubene parish
 Sala parish
 Sauka parish
 Sēlpils parish
 Varieši parish
 Viesīte city
 Vīpe parish
 Zasa parish

References 

Districts of Latvia